is a Japanese track and field athlete, who mostly competes in heptathlon, sprint and hurdles. She placed fifth-seventh in various events at the 2015 and 2017 Asian Championships and 2018 Asian Games.

References

1993 births
Living people
Japanese heptathletes
Japanese female sprinters
Japanese female hurdlers
Asian Games competitors for Japan
Athletes (track and field) at the 2018 Asian Games
21st-century Japanese women